Alexander Keiller or Keillor may refer to:

Alexander Keiller (archaeologist) (1899–1955), Scottish archaeologist who worked at Avebury
Alexander Keiller Museum, Avebury
Alexander Keiller (businessman) (1804–74), Scottish businessman who founded Göteborgs Mekaniska Verkstad
Alexander Keiller (physician) (1811–92), Scottish physician and obstetrician
Alex Keillor (1869–1960), Scottish footballer